Avanzada Regia was a musical movement in the mid-1990s from Monterrey in Mexico.

Origins 

In 1995, the group Zurdok Movimiento won the Battle of the Bands at the Rockotitlan music festival, becoming the first band not from Mexico City to win it, thus creating such expectations towards the city that the record labels began to move there to search for groups. La Ultima de Lucas, made up of young people all under twenty years old, but which had talented musicians in its lineup, was the first band from Monterrey to sign a record contract.

The Latin American phenomenon of Control Machete was followed by, by way of a domino effect, more bands. Zurdok Movimiento (who started it all) were finally signed by Discos Manicomio, an imprint of PolyGram, as well as the rapcore group called La Flor de Lingo.

Albums released by Avanzada regia bands 
 Mucho Barato, Control Machete, 1996
 Antena, Zurdok, 1997
 Aquamosh, Plastilina Mosh, 1997
 Libres y locos, El Gran Silencio, 1998
 Guadalupe Flava, Flor de Lingo, 1998
 Restaurant, Jumbo, 1999
 Artillería pesada, Control Machete, 1999
 Hombre Sintetizador, Zurdok, 1999
 Tatuajes de pólvora, Cabrito Vudú, 1999
 Juan Manuel, Plastilina Mosh, 2000
 Chúntaro Radio Poder, El Gran Silencio, 2000
 ¿Picas o platicas?, Genitallica, 2000
 Galería, Turbo 7, 2000
 Arroz con leche, Panda, 2000
 D. D. y ponle Play, Jumbo, 2001
 Maquillaje, Zurdok, 2001
 Kinky, Kinky, 2001
 Volován, Volován, 2002
 El canto que espanta la pena, La Verbena Popular, 2002
 Alma en fuego, Inspector, 2002
 Sin vaselina, Genitallica, 2002
 Cartel de Santa, Cartel de Santa, 2002
 La Revancha Del Príncipe Charro, Panda, 2002
 Ella es azul, Volován, 2003
 Teleparque, Jumbo, 2003
 Uno, Dos, Bandera, Control Machete, 2003
 Hola Chicuelos, Plastilina Mosh, 2003
 Atlas, Kinky, 2003
 Ni lados B, ni lados A, Cabrito Vudú, 2003
 Super Riddim Internacional Vol. 1, El Gran Silencio, 2004
 Cartel de Santa Vol II, Cartel de Santa, 2004
 ConSEXcuencias, Genitallica, 2004
 Unidad, Cerveza y Ska, Inspector, 2004
 Boomerang, Cabrito Vudú, 2004
 Cuarto Gris, Mares de Nepente, 2005
 Para ti con desprecio, Panda, 2005
 Gran Panoramico, Jumbo, 2005
 Vaquero, Vaquero, 2005
 Monitor, Volován, 2006
 Reina, Kinky, 2006
 Volumen Prohibido, Cartel de Santa, 2006
 Tasty + B-Sides, Plastilina Mosh, 2006
 Comunicaflow Underground, El Gran Silencio, 2006
 Blanco fácil, Chetes, 2006
 Amantes Sunt Amentes, Panda, 2006
 Amar o morir, Inspector, 2006
 Monitor (special edition), Volován, 2007
 Dusan (album), Dusan, 2007
 Segundo Round, Flor De Lingo, 2007
 Efecto Dominó, Chetes, 2008
 Volumen IV, Cartel de Santa, 2008
 Barracuda, Kinky, 2008
 Hogar, Volován, 2009
 Poetics, Panda, 2009
 Solo con plumón, Filozofia pAnk, 2010
 Canciones de amor para un mundo imperfecto, 2010
 Hipnosis, Chetes, 2010
 Sueño de la Maquina, Kinky, 2011
 Revolution Radio, Mexican Dubwiser, 2012
 Electric City, Mexican Dubwiser, 2014
 Border Frequency, Mexican Dubwiser, 2016

See also
 Latin hip hop
 Latino punk
 Rock en tu idioma
 Mexican rock

References

Mexican music
Nuevo León